Lee Yul-eum (born February 16, 1996) is a South Korean actress. She is best known for her roles in television series such as The Village: Achiara's Secret, Dae Jang Geum Is Watching, Queen: Love and War and Nevertheless.

Filmography

Television series

Web series

Film

Awards and nominations

References

External links
 Lee Yul-eum at Namoo Actors
 
 

1996 births
Living people
21st-century South Korean actresses
South Korean television actresses
South Korean film actresses